Martín Eduardo Suárez Debattista (born 16 June 2004) is a Uruguayan professional footballer who plays as a midfielder for Montevideo Wanderers.

Career
A youth academy graduate of Montevideo Wanderers, Suárez made his professional debut on 12 March 2021 in a 3–0 league defeat against Plaza Colonia.

Suárez is a Uruguayan youth international. He was included in the national team for the 2019 South American U-15 Championship.

Career statistics

References

External links
 

2004 births
Living people
Footballers from Montevideo
Association football midfielders
Uruguayan footballers
Uruguay youth international footballers
Uruguayan Primera División players
Montevideo Wanderers F.C. players